Jalatharangam is a 1978 Indian Malayalam film, directed by P. Chandrakumar and produced by R. M. Sreenivasan. The film stars Madhu, Sheela, Adoor Bhasi and Baby Babitha in the lead roles. The film has musical score by A. T. Ummer.

Cast

Madhu 
Sheela 
Adoor Bhasi 
Baby Babitha
Kuthiravattam Pappu 
P. K. Abraham 
Sumithra 
Vincent

Soundtrack
The music was composed by A. T. Ummer and the lyrics were written by Sathyan Anthikkad and Dr. Balakrishnan.

References

External links
 

1978 films
1970s Malayalam-language films
Films directed by P. Chandrakumar